Rottenegg is a village in the Hallertau of Bavaria, Germany. Formerly a separate municipality, it is now part of the municipality of Geisenfeld in the Upper Bavarian district of Pfaffenhofen.

Location

Rottenegg is located in the Danube-Isar Hills of the Lower Bavarian Upland.
The former municipality and present village of Rottenegg includes the hamlets of Hornlohe, Moosmühle and Brunn.

History

From 1169 to 1279 the family of the Counts of Rotteneck were resident at this location, originally called Schermbach.
They were descendants of the Lord of Abensberg. 
On 21 August 1279 the last male descendant of the family, Heinrich II von Rotteneck, the Bishop Count of Regensburg, sold Rottenegg castle and its possessions including the Mainburg castle to Duke Ludwig II of Bavaria so he could build his cathedral.

The castle of Rotteneck was expanded in 1551. In 1705 it was damaged during the War of the Spanish Succession (1701–1714). It was demolished in 1722-24.
From then the castle was a ruin.
In 1722 a church was built on the site in a picturesque location above the village, preserving a part of the castle wall.
The French Brigadier General Henri François Lambert of the Army of the Rhine and Moselle who died on 7 September 1796 in Neustadt an der Donau is buried here.
The piece of shrapnel that fatally injured him is kept in the village church of Mauern, Neustadt at his request.

On 1 January 1978 Rottenegg was incorporated into the town of Geisenfeld.

Economy

Until the 1980s hop growing was an important occupation in Rottenegg, and many hop farms are found today, often abandoned. 
Modernization measures eliminated many jobs in this industry. Today, many farms are being converted for use in forestry.

Associations
Home Sports Club (Heimsportverein) Rottenegg
Soldiers and veterans club
Burschenverein
Rottenegg Volunteer Fire Brigade

Gallery

References

Pfaffenhofen (district)
Villages in Bavaria